Pallas's gull (Ichthyaetus ichthyaetus), also known as the great black-headed gull, is a large bird species. As is the case with many gulls, it has traditionally been placed in the genus Larus. The scientific name is from Ancient Greek. Ichthyaetus is from ikhthus, "fish", and aetos, "eagle".

Distribution

This species breeds in colonies in marshes and islands from southern Russia to Mongolia. It is migratory, wintering in the eastern Mediterranean, Arabia and India. This gull nests on the ground, laying between two and four eggs.

It occurs in western Europe only as a rare vagrant. In Great Britain a recent review left a single occurrence in 1859 as the only acceptable record of this bird. The species also occurs as a vagrant in differing parts of the Indian Ocean, south of its normal range, and along the northern and eastern coasts of Africa, where it visits annually on an irregular basis.

Description
This is a very large gull, being easily the world's largest black-headed gull and the third largest species of gull in the world, after the great black-backed gull and the glaucous gull. It measures  in length with a  wingspan. Summer adults are unmistakable, since no other gull of this size has a black hood. The adults have grey wings and back, with conspicuous white "mirrors" at the wing tips. The legs are yellow and the bill is orangey-yellow with a red tip.

In all other plumages, a dark mask through the eye indicates the vestiges of the hood. The call is a deep aargh cry. Young birds attain largely grey upperparts quite rapidly, but they take four years to reach maturity.

Ecology
This bird has a deep, rather nasal flight-call which resembles the call of the lesser black-backed gull. Although they are noisy at colonies, Pallas's gulls are mostly silent when breeding.

These birds are predatory, taking fish, crustaceans, insects and even small mammals.

The Pallas's gull is one of the species to which the Agreement on the Conservation of African-Eurasian Migratory Waterbirds (AEWA) applies.

Status
Birdlife international has assessed the Pallas's gull as a species of “least concern” with an increasing population. In 2015, the global population was estimated to be at 125,000 to 1 million gulls. However, this may be questionable as the Pallas's gull faces noticeable threats throughout its range. 

When it comes to breeding, the gull is practically endemic to the central Asian lakes, much of which are being affected by the tourist industries causing disturbances to the gull. Its breeding range is limited to several fragmented locations stretching from Ukraine to Mongolia It is also particularly prone to avian flu, with several hundred individuals dying in 2006 as a result of the disease.

BirdsoftheWorld challenges the population trend established by Birdlife international, citing that the Pallas's gull is threatened by the Caspian gull, a rapidly expanding species that threatens nesting individuals by predating on their young. 

Overall, the Pallas's gull may be subject to several threats and might be uplisted as a result of its limited range and threats it faces.

References

External links

 
 
 
 
 
 
 
 

Pallas's gull
Birds of Central Asia
Pallas's gull
Taxobox binomials not recognized by IUCN
Taxa named by Peter Simon Pallas